Altra is an island in Alstahaug Municipality in Nordland county, Norway. The  island lies between the large island of Alsta and the small island of Tenna (in Herøy Municipality).

There are a few small villages on the island: Austbø in the north, Korsvegen and Blomsøya in the middle, and Hestøya in the south.  The island has a regular ferry connection to the neighboring islands of Alsta and Sør-Herøy.  In 2016, there were 76 residents living on the island.

See also
List of islands of Norway

References

Alstahaug
Islands of Nordland